Ṣidqa (Philistine: 𐤑𐤃𐤒𐤀 *Ṣīdqāʾ;) was a king of Ashkelon in the 8th century BC. He, much like Hezekiah, king of the neighboring Kingdom of Judah, rebelled against the Assyrian king Sennacherib. Sennacherib eventually put the rebellion down, and by 701 BC had destroyed the cities of Beth-Dagon, Joppa, Banai-Barqa, and Azjuru. Sidqa was forced to pay tribute following his defeat. After the revolt, Sennacherib placed Šarru-lu-dari, the son of Sidqa's predecessor, Rukibtu, on the throne of Ashkelon. Despite this, Šarru-lu-dari was apparently succeeded by Sidqa's son, Mitinti.

References

Philistine kings
Philistines
8th-century BC rulers
Ashkelon